Joe Brown (born March 5, 1977) is a former American football defensive tackle who played for the Seattle Seahawks of the National Football League (NFL). He played college football at Ohio State University.

References

1977 births
Living people
American football defensive tackles
Ohio State Buckeyes football players
Seattle Seahawks players
Players of American football from Columbus, Ohio
Players of American football from Tucson, Arizona